Mohamed Benhima (Arabic: محمد بنهيمة; June 25, 1924 – November 23, 1992) was Prime Minister of Morocco, serving from 7 July 1967 to 6 October 1969. He was born in Safi (Asfi) to Taïbi Benhima and Rkia Benhida. He was also Minister of Education and Minister of the Interior.

Personal life
He is the father of Driss Benhima, the CEO of Royal Air Maroc.

Death 
He died on 23 November 1992, in Rabat.

References

1924 births
1992 deaths
B
Benhima, Mohamed
People from Safi, Morocco
20th-century Moroccan physicians